Minnamari "Minttu" Tuominen (born 26 June 1990) is a Finnish ice hockey player, currently signed with the Metropolitan Riveters of the Premier Hockey Federation (PHF) for the 2022–23 season. A member of the Finnish national ice hockey team since 2008, she has earned medals at three Winter Olympic Games and five IIHF World Women's Championships.

Playing career

Finland
Tuominen played for the Espoo Blues and attended Makelanrinne Sports High School in Helsinki. As a member of the Espoo Blues, she won the Finnish Championship three times (2007, 2008, 2009). In addition, she played in the 2009 MLP Cup with the Finnish National Team. She was a member of the bronze medal-winning Finnish team at the 2009 Winter Universiade in Harbin, China. She also helped Finland win the Euro Hockey Tour in December 2008. Other appearances for Team Finland include events in 2008, including the Four Nations Cup in November and a series against Sweden in September. At Makelanrinne, captained the team after being named one of the school's top athletes of 2007 and 2008. One of her teammates with the Espoo Blues was Emma Laaksonen.

Ohio State Buckeyes
Milestones at Ohio State include:
First goal: 3 October 2009, at Boston University
First assist: 2 October 2009, at Boston University

International
Tuominen won a bronze medal at the 2010 Four Nations Cup in St. John's, Newfoundland.

Career statistics

Regular season and playoffs 
Sources:

Finland

References

External links
 
 
 
 

1990 births
Living people
Espoo Blues Naiset players
Finnish expatriate ice hockey players in Russia
Finnish expatriate ice hockey players in Sweden
Finnish expatriate ice hockey players in the United States
Finnish women's ice hockey defencemen
Ice hockey people from Helsinki
Ice hockey players at the 2010 Winter Olympics
Ice hockey players at the 2014 Winter Olympics
Ice hockey players at the 2018 Winter Olympics
Ice hockey players at the 2022 Winter Olympics
Kiekko-Espoo Naiset players
Linköping HC Dam players
Medalists at the 2010 Winter Olympics
Medalists at the 2018 Winter Olympics
Medalists at the 2022 Winter Olympics
Metropolitan Riveters players
Ohio State Buckeyes women's ice hockey players
Olympic bronze medalists for Finland
Olympic ice hockey players of Finland
Olympic medalists in ice hockey
Shenzhen KRS Vanke Rays players